SEPTA Routes 101 and 102, also known as the Media–Sharon Hill Line, are light rail lines operated by the Suburban Transit Division of the Southeastern Pennsylvania Transportation Authority, serving portions of Delaware County. The routes' eastern terminus is 69th Street Transportation Center in Upper Darby, Pennsylvania. Route 101 runs to Media, while Route 102 goes to Sharon Hill. The lines were formerly interurbans.

Along with the Norristown High Speed Line, formerly the Philadelphia and Western Railroad, the routes are the remaining lines of the Red Arrow Lines Trolley System once operated by the Philadelphia Suburban Transportation Company (successor to the Philadelphia and West Chester Traction Company); some local residents still call them "Red Arrow".

This route uses 29 Kawasaki Heavy Industries Rolling Stock Company Type K LRV cars similar to those used on the SEPTA Subway–Surface Trolley Lines. However, unlike the city cars, the Type K cars on Routes 101 and 102 are double-ended and use pantograph collection instead of trolley poles.

Current system 

Route 101 continues on its own right-of-way traveling west and southwest through Drexel Hill and Springfield with an important stop at the Springfield Mall before entering the street in Media. The 101 has double tracks to Woodland Avenue, then a single track to just before Pine Ridge, then enters the street at Providence Road in Media and runs on a single track the rest of the way. Cars in the street must yield to the trolley. The line terminates in the middle of the street just west of the Delaware County Courthouse.

Route 102 runs southeast from Drexel Hill Junction through Drexel Hill and Clifton Heights and then goes into the street in Aldan. After Aldan, it returns to its own right-of-way, then passes through Collingdale before terminating at Chester Pike in Sharon Hill. The 102 has double tracks until up to North Street in Collingdale, where the 102 returns to its own right-of-way, and after North Street, there is a single track until the end of the line.

Springfield Road contains two stops along both lines. Route 101 stops at Springfield Road in Springfield. Route 102 stops at Springfield Road in Clifton Heights, then joins this street until it moves onto Woodlawn Avenue through Aldan.

History 

The Sharon Hill Line (Route 102) was originally built by the Philadelphia and West Chester Traction Company, and opened on March 15, 1906, and the Media Line (Route 101) was originally built by the same company, opening on April 1, 1913. The lines were later bought by the Philadelphia Suburban Transit Company in 1954. 

Besides Routes 101 and 102, there were also two other, now defunct, Red Arrow trolley lines. The direct ancestor of the SEPTA Route 104 bus line went to West Chester, splitting off from the rest of the system right after 69th Street Transportation Center onto West Chester Pike. The tracks continued all the way up West Chester Pike. West Chester trolleys were replaced by buses in 1954 due to widening of West Chester Pike; rush-hour trips to Westgate Hills lasted until 1958. Tracks remained in use for access to the Red Arrow's carbarn in Llanerch until SEPTA closed the barn in 1971; all tracks were soon removed except for a portion near 69th Street that SEPTA occasionally uses to store out-of service trolleys. The other now-defunct Red Arrow trolley line went to Ardmore until December 1966. It split from the West Chester line at Llanerch and continued on its own exclusive right-of-way. Much of the right-of-way still remains between Schauffele Plaza in Ardmore (the former terminus of the line) and Eagle Road in Havertown, although the tracks were removed and the right-of-way paved for dedicated use by the replacement bus line, now SEPTA Route 103. The 103 still uses this private right-of-way, although much of its other street routing has changed.

On April 1, 2020, service on Route 102 was suspended while Route 101 was substituted with buses due to the COVID-19 pandemic. Trolley service on both routes resumed June 1, 2020.

In 2021, SEPTA proposed rebranding their rail transit service as "SEPTA Metro", in order to make the system easier to navigate. Under this proposal, the Media and Sharon Hill lines will be rebranded as the "D" lines (for "Delaware", the county in which the trolley routes are located) with a pink color and numeric suffixes for each service. The 101 and 102 will respectively be rebranded as the D1 69th St / Orange St and D2 69th St / Sharon Hill. After a period of public comment, SEPTA revised its plans to primarily refer to the line as the "D Line," without number designations, as well as to rethink the name of the Route 101's "Orange Street" terminal station name.

Media stops
Media is the western terminus of the Route 101 trolley line just west of the Orange Street intersection with State Street, the latter of which the trolley runs down the center line.  Despite being located in the town, there is no direct connection to the Media station of the Media/Wawa Line which is a mile to the south on Orange Street and partly through a wooded area.

Stations and stops

See also 
 Railroad bus

References

External links

U.S. Urban Rail Transit Lines Opened From 1980 (PDF)
Rt. 101/102 – Media/Sharon Hill; Images, guide, and slight history at World-NYC Subway.org

101 and 102
Light rail in Pennsylvania
101 and 102
Interurban railways in Pennsylvania
5 ft 2¼ in gauge railways in the United States
600 V DC railway electrification
Railway lines opened in 1906
1906 establishments in Pennsylvania